Time Warp is an annual electronic music festival originated in Mannheim, Germany.

The premiere was in 1994 in the " Walzmühle" in Ludwigshafen. Since 2000, the Mannheim Maimarkthalle has been a permanent venue every spring, with DJ greats such as Sven Väth, Carl Cox and Richie Hawtin being present from the very beginning.  In 2019 the festival celebrated its 25th anniversary in Germany and was - as in the years before - completely sold out. 

The Time Warp Festival has also been present abroad since 2005, with stops in Prague, Vienna, Turin, Milan, Zurich and from 2008 to 2014 regularly in the Netherlands.

From 2014 on, festivals in Buenos Aires and New York City followed. Since 2018 the festival has been taking place in São Paulo in Brazil in addition to Germany.

Line-ups 1994–present

See also

List of electronic music festivals

External links
 – official site
Time Warp Festival on Facebook

Music festivals established in 1994
Tourist attractions in Mannheim
Electronic music festivals in Germany